The Mishmi people of Tibet and Arunachal Pradesh are an ethnic group located in the northeastern tip of the central Arunachal Pradesh in Upper and Lower Dibang Valley, Lohit and Anjaw Districts, all bordering southern Tibet in northeast India. The area is known as the Mishmi Hills. Only one group, called the Deng, occupy Zayu County in southern Tibet.

The Mishmi consist of four tribes: Idu Mishmi (Idu Lhoba); Digaro tribe (Taraon, Darang Deng), Miju Mishmi (Kaman Deng), and the Deng Mishmi. The four sub-divisions of the tribe emerged due to the geographical distribution, but racially all the four groups are of the same stock.

The Idu are also known as Yidu Lhoba in Tibet and often referred as Chulikatas in Assam. The Idus are primarily concentrated in the Upper Dibang Valley and Lower Dibang Valley district and parts of the northern part of Lohit district of Arunachal Pradesh in India. Taraon, also called Digaru Mishmis, are distributed in the hill and the foothills between the Dibang, Digaru and the Lohit rivers. Kamans are also known as the Miju Mishmis; they live between the Lohit and the Kambang rivers in the foothills and in the Mishmi Hills on both sides of the Lohit river right up to the frontiers to Rima. There are around 30,000 of them in Arunachal Pradesh.

The Idu-Mishmi believes that Rukmini-Chief Consort of Lord Krishna belonged to their tribe. The plays and dances on ‘Rukmini haran’ are  common.There is a legend that 
Lord Krishna asked the Mishmi people to cut their hair as a form of punishment for not allowing him to marry Rukmini. Due to this Idu-Mishmi people are also called "chulikata" (chuli-hair, kata- cut). Most of these are   considered to be a fabrication. Historians point to the creation of these myths during the propagation of the eksarana-namadharma in the 16th century around Sadiya, which influenced the regional identity of the place. The Mishmis began to identity with the legendary Vaishnava characters created during this period which led to the formation of a alternate identity.

In China
 
In China, the Mishmi-Idu are classified as Lhoba people.

The Deng people (or Dengba, Chinese transcription of Taraon-Kaman languages: 代巴玫; Chinese: 僜人; Hanyu pinyin: Dèng Rén) live in nine villages in Tibet's Zayu County and virgin forest areas between the Himalayas and the Hengduan Mountains at an elevation of 1000 meters. Bradley (2007) reports 800  (Chinese: Darang Deng) and 200  (Chinese: Geman Deng; known as the Kaman or Miju Mishmi in India) in China, one village in Burma where they are known as Taraung, and the Taraon, Tayin, or Tain (formerly Digaru Mishmi) in northeastern India.

There is little information on this group due to the sensitivity of the region. The last coordinated effort to understand the Mishmi occurred in the year 1985, after the Chinese academy of social sciences dispatched a total of four anthropologists hailing from the institute of Ethnology and Anthropology.

The Deng Mishmi are not officially recognised by the government of People's Republic of China. (Aiyadurai & Lee, 2018) note that instead, "...they are classified as an 'unidentified ethnicity' or 'others', largely due to the nature of a category for characterizing only a handful of people in contemporary China." Many of them have migrated from China to India.

During the British Raj 
The beginning of British rule in India with regards to the hill people was generally one of non-interference due to a fear of rebellion from these groups.

However, this policy changed when the British began to realize how important the frontier region of Assam and the adjoining hills (including the Mishmi Hills) were for  trade.

According to (Aiyadurai & Lee, 2018), "Another strategic reason to manage such an area was that the British were concerned that if they did not take interest in this region, the Mishmi people would end up becoming 'Chinese' subjects. To win over the local native people, governmental representatives carried with them tea and cigarettes as 'political presents'". Officially, it was not until the murder of Noel Williamson (a political officer) and Dr Gregorson (a tea planter and doctor) that the British began to clamp down on the Mishmi in a show of force and dominance.

The British perceived the Mishmi as something to be contained, and not understood. The Mishmi, in 1882, were labelled as “untouched by any civilizing influences”. The  natives in general were typically viewed “as less than human and abominable”.

Creation myth

It is part of the folklore of the Deng people that their ancestor is Ajiani.

Notes

References
 
 
 Aiyadurai, A., & Lee, C. S. (2017). Living on the Sino-Indian border : The story of the Mishmis in Arunachal Pradesh, Northeast India. Asian Ethnology, 76(2), 367–395.

External links

 RCILTS, IIT Guwahati
 Photo of two Miju Mishmi women
 Britannica entry of the Mishmi
 Internary reference on various localities of the Mishmi
 http://www.ethnic-china.com/Deng/dengindex.htm
 https://web.archive.org/web/20070518105343/http://zt.tibet.cn/tibetzt/ssmz_en/deng/001.htm
 ethnic-china.com
 zt.tibet.cn

Tribes of Arunachal Pradesh
Ethnic groups in China
Ethnic groups in Northeast India
Ethnic groups in South Asia